The 2013–14 Wessex Football League (known as the Sydenhams Football League (Wessex) for sponsorship reasons) was the 28th season of the Wessex Football League since its establishment in 1986.

The league consisted of two divisions: the Premier Division and Division One. Both divisions this season consisted of an extra team than the previous season – the Premier Division had 22 teams and Division One had 17 teams.

Premier Division

The Premier Division featured 22 teams, increased from the 21 teams which competed in the previous season, after Alton Town were transferred to the Combined Counties Football League, Hayling United were demoted to Division One due to ground grading problems, and New Milton Town were relegated.

Four teams joined the division:
Brockenhurst, champions of Division One.
Sholing, having resigned from the Southern League. 
Whitchurch United, runners-up in Division One.
Winchester City, relegated from the Southern League.
GE Hamble F.C. changed their name back to Folland Sports F.C.
Clubs that applied for promotion to Step 4 were: A.F.C. Portchester, Newport IOW, Sholing and Winchester City.

League table

Stadia and locations

Division One
Division One featured 17 teams, increased from the 16 teams which competed in the previous season, after Brockenhurst and Whitchurch United were promoted to the Premier Division.

Three clubs joined the division:
Andover Town, a newly formed club.
Hayling United, demoted from the Premier Division after failing ground grading.
New Milton Town, relegated from the Premier Division.

League table

Stadia and locations

References

External links
 Wessex Football League official site

Wessex Football League seasons
9